Tracey Birdsall (born July 6, 1963) is an American actress.

Biography
Birdsall was born in Van Nuys, California. and grew up in Burbank, California.

She started performing as a young girl, on stage and in front of the camera. She recalls
"My mother drove me to the Gary Dance Studio for lessons constantly as far back as I can remember. She would sew my costumes, drive me to rehearsals, and support me in my shows. It was in my blood, and my fondest childhood memories were on stage."
As a teenager, she sang in choirs at local churches. After appearing in a Sunkist Soda commercial, she appeared in several other TV commercials while she attended acting classes and went to auditions. She appeared in the soap opera Loving, hosted Million Dollar Showcase of Homes and was a special news reporter for CNBC.

She co-wrote, produced and starred in the TV movie short Tick Tock in 2010. Tick Tock has appeared in several film festivals in the United States, Mexico and New Zealand, winning several awards:
BEST SHORT CINEMATOGRAPHY: Kent Film Festival, Conn.
AWARD OF MERIT, Short Film: Accolade Film Awards
AWARD OF MERIT, Best Leading Actress: Accolade Film Awards
THE GOLDEN PALM AWARD: Mexico International Film Festival
FINALIST: USA Film Festival

In 2011, Birdsall, at age 48, was one of 10 finalists nationwide to make it into the Wilhelmina Models "40+" contest.

Filmography

Film

Television

Writer/Producer
Tick Tock (short) – co-writer, producer (2010)
I Might Even Love You – producer (1998)

Awards and honors
Actress of the Year, United Nations Women in Film, 2019 
Female Action Performer of the Year, 2016, Action on Film Festival 
Action on Film Festival, August 2010 – won for Best Actress in Tick Tock
Action on Film Festival, August 2014- Received Honorary Maverick Award
Action on Film Festival, August 2014- Won best ensemble cast in "Dawn of the Crescent MoonAction on Film Festival, August 2014- won for Best comedy scene in Do you like your Balls?''

Personal life
Tracey Birdsall lives in Malibu, California. She flew relief missions to less accessible airports in Haiti following the 2010 Haiti earthquake. She has two daughters and one son.

References

External links

American film actresses
American television actresses
Film producers from California
Actresses from Los Angeles
1963 births
Living people
People from Van Nuys, Los Angeles
American women film producers
21st-century American women